Orndorff is a German language locational surname, which is a variant of Orendorff. It originally meant a person from the village of Ohrdruf or Ohrdorf in Germany.  Notable people with the names include:

Alfred Orendorff (1845–1909), American politician
George Orendorff (1906–1984), American jazz trumpeter.
Jess Orndorff (1881–1960), American baseball player
Paul Orndorff (1949–2021), American professional wrestler

See also
Ohlendorf, surname
Orndoff (disambiguation), includes list of people with the surname Orndoff

References

German-language surnames